Sílvia Soler Espinosa was the defending champion, but lost in the quarterfinals to Jessica Pieri.

Kateryna Kozlova won the title, defeating Mariana Duque in the final, 7–6(8–6), 6–4.

Seeds

Draw

Finals

Top half

Bottom half

References
Main Draw

Torneo Internazionale Femminile Antico Tiro a Volo - Singles